Oleg Dmitrievich Dimov (born March 8, 1968, Vladychen', Bolhrad Raion) is a Russian political figure and a deputy of the 8th State Duma.

In 1989 Dimov graduated from The Novosibirsk Higher Military-Political Combined Arms School. In 2013 he was awarded the Doctor of Sciences degree in economics.  From 2004 to 2010, he was the deputy of the Orenburg City Council. He left the post to become Deputy Head of the City of Orenburg. In 2011, Dimov was appointed the vice-governor and the Chief of Staff of the Governor and Government of the Orenburg oblast. From 2013-to 2015, he was Deputy Prime Minister of the Orenburg Oblast.

In September 2021, Oleg Dimov was elected deputy for the 8th State Duma. He joined the working group on relations with the parliaments of the Benelux Union.

References

1968 births
Living people
United Russia politicians
21st-century Russian politicians
Eighth convocation members of the State Duma (Russian Federation)